HMS Arab was an  composite gunvessel built for the Royal Navy in 1874. She served in the East Indies and was sold in 1889.

Design and construction
Designed by Nathaniel Barnaby, the Royal Navy's Chief Constructor, Arab was ordered from the Govan yard of Robert Napier and Sons in 1873 and laid down the same year as yard number 333. She was launched on 13 October 1874 and commissioned at Devonport in August 1875.

Her hull was built of iron frames and ribs, and planked in wood. This "composite" construction was both cheap and easy to repair and allowed the wooden planking to be coppered, reducing marine growth. On far-flung colonial stations, the benefits of both simple repair and reduced marine growth were particularly positive, due to a lack of substantial ship repair and careening facilities. For this reason, smaller vessels like the Arab class continued to use composite construction until long after larger vessels had transitioned to iron or steel construction.

Propulsion
A single screw was provided, which could be hoisted clear of the water to improve the ship's hull lines when sailing. She achieved a trials speed of  under power. A sailing rig was provided, with square rig on the fore and main masts, and fore-and-aft rigging only on the mizzen, giving her a "barque" rig.

Armament
A single 7-inch rifled muzzle-loading gun amidships and two 6.3-inch 64-pounder rifled muzzle-loading guns, one forward and one aft, and both fitted on traversing slides, constituted her main armament. Two machine guns and a light gun were also fitted. Arab (but not her sister ship, Lily) was re-armed in about 1879, with the after 6.3-inch 64-pounder gun replaced by three 20-pounder breech-loading guns under a newly constructed poop deck.

Service
Arab served on the East Indies station. In January 1876, she ran aground on a reef off Zanzibar and was severely damaged. She was refloated and temporary repairs were made. She sailed for Bombay, India on 11 January for permanent repairs. Arab was ordered to return home in 1879, receiving a revised armament at about that time.

Fate
Arab was sold in 1889.

Footnotes

Bibliography

 

 

Ships built in Govan
Arab-class gunvessels
1874 ships
Maritime incidents in January 1876